Carlos Arvelo Guevara was known for being a distinguished professor, and the first military doctor of Venezuela, and he played an important role in establishing health services in the country. Many places were named after him like the municipality of Carlos Arvelo since 1936, and the military hospital of Carlos Arvelo located in Caracas.

Early life and education 
He was born in the town of Güigüe on June 1, 1784, to Don Idelfonso Fernando de Arvelo and Doña Eugenia de Guevara.

Despite having no financial resources, he was able to study in la Real
y Pontificia Universidad de Caracas (now Central University of Venezuela), thanks to a special scholarship granted by the Board of Inspection of the university, due to his financial status and being outstanding in his studies, where he demonstrated a particular and astonishing interest for social application of scientific and clinical knowledge.

At the beginning of his medical studies he began an internship at "el Hospital General de Caridad" (The General Hospital of Charity), being appointed by one of his professors, Dr. Alejandro Echezuría, and with the authorization of the Rector of the university.

When he wasn't studying, he accompanied Dr. Felipe Tamaris, his Professor who distinguished him among all his disciples, by letting Arvelo assist him in arduous cases of his practices. Plus, Tamaris awarded him the medal for talent and contraction.

In 1809 he received the bachelor's degree of Medicine. In 1810 he replaced José Joaquín Hernández, one of his professors, who was sent to the Valleys of Aragua in the campaign against a fever epidemic that broke out there, without having yet the Doctorate in Medicine which he received later that year. He recommended burning all the piles of seeds and cotton that existed in the Valleys. That intervention, one of the most outstanding of his profession, made him worthy of numerous recognitions, especially among the inhabitants of Aragua who entitled him "el bienhechor" (the benefactor).

Involvement in the Independence War 
In 1810 he joined the patriotic army, forming part of the Farmers' Squadron where he was named Captain-Surgeon, and later became director of the Military Hospital of Caracas in 1811. He participated in the Battle of Vigirima (1813) and a year later in the battle of "San Mateo" and La Victoria where he received a serious bullet wound in the thorax which made him retire from military service and  practice his profession as surgeon in Caracas until the independence of Venezuela in 1821. His involvement in the war earned him the appointment as Surgeon in Chief of the Venezuelan Army, granted by Simon Bolivar. Bolivar labeled the attention Arvelo offered to the wounded soldiers as "impeccably human".

Later life
In 1822 he was part of a Commission in charge of studying an improvement plan for the Central University of Venezuela, along with José Vargas and other illustrious doctors. He then became leader of the reform that opened the way to the creation of the Medical Faculty of Caracas, which was achieved in 1827 by a Decree from Bolivar dated June 25 of that year, replacing the old Protomedicato founded in 1777 by Lorenzo Campins and Ballester.

In 1827 Arvelo Guevara was appointed director of the chair of Internal Pathology and Therapeutics of the Central University of Venezuela (UCV). A year later, after being ranked  first in the contest, he obtained the chair of Practical and Internal Medicine, in which he remained for twenty years. In addition, he was Vice Chancellor of the university in 1834 and principal director of the Faculty of Medicine the following year. In 1846 he occupied the position of Rector of the UCV. Commissioned by the National Government, in 1852 Arvelo Guevara supervised the experimental researches for treatments of Measles during a measles epidemic that broke out in Venezuela. His rigorous inspection facilitated the control of the disease.

Marriage and Death
He married in 1826, Manuela Echeandía, daughter of the Colombian Colonel Manuel de Echeandía, and she was his companion till her death in 1861. They had six sons who among them Carlos, doctor like his father and future rector of the Caracas University. Plus one of his other sons was killed during the war. He died on October 17, 1862, in Maiquetía and his remains rest in the National Pantheon since the 16th of December 1942.

List of Positions He Held
Member, together with José María Vargas, of the project of reforms of the Royal and Pontifical University of Caracas (1822)
Co-founder of the Medical Instruction Society of Venezuela (1822)
Vice-president of UCV (1834)
Rector of UCV (1846)
Senator and State counsellor (1849-1859)
Member of the Board of Abolition of Slavery (1855)

See also
Carlos Arvelo Municipality
Hospital Militar Dr. Carlos Arvelo

References

1784 births
1862 deaths
People from Carabobo
Venezuelan independence activists
Central University of Venezuela alumni
Venezuelan surgeons
Burials at the National Pantheon of Venezuela